Kenneth Malcolm Sutherland-Graeme  was an eminent Anglican priest.

He was the incumbent at St Margaret, Aberdeen and then Holy Trinity, Stirling before
becoming  Provost of St Paul's Cathedral, Dundee in 1931, a post he held for nine years.

References

Scottish Episcopalian clergy
Provosts of St Paul's Cathedral, Dundee